HMHS China was a hospital ship that served with the Royal Navy during the First World War. She was launched in 1896 for P&O as RMS China from Harland and Wolff in Belfast.

Four crew from the ship died after hitting a mine in a whaler while China was moored at Scapa Flow.

See also
 List of hospitals and hospital ships of the Royal Navy

References

Hospital ships in World War I
Ships of the Royal Navy
1896 ships